Siegmar Karl Ohlemann (May 11, 1938 – November 6, 2022) was a German-born Canadian middle distance runner. He competed in three events (800 metres, 4 × 100 metres and 4 × 400 metres) at the 1960 Summer Olympics in Rome, Italy. Ohlemann claimed the silver medal in 800 metres at the 1963 Pan American Games in Brazil, behind fellow Canadian Don Bertoia.

Ohlemann died in Eugene, Oregon on November 6, 2022, at the age of 84.

References

External links
 Canadian Olympic Committee

1938 births
2022 deaths
Canadian male middle-distance runners
Oregon Ducks men's track and field athletes
Athletes (track and field) at the 1959 Pan American Games
Athletes (track and field) at the 1960 Summer Olympics
Athletes (track and field) at the 1963 Pan American Games
Olympic track and field athletes of Canada
German emigrants to Canada
Pan American Games silver medalists for Canada
Pan American Games medalists in athletics (track and field)
Medalists at the 1963 Pan American Games
Sportspeople from Kassel